Reszel Castle (Polish: Zamek w Reszlu) is a castle located in Reszel by the bank of the river Sajna, in the south-east of the town.

The castle, an  Ordensburg fortress, was built in between 1350 and 1401 by the Teutonic Order. The castle was frequently looted, besieged and gained by Polish and Teutonic forces. In the nineteenth century the castle was adapted into a prison, the castle was fully renovated after the Second World War.

Currently the castle houses the branch of the Museum of the Warmian-Masurian Voivodeship in Olsztyn, (Polish: Muzeum Warmii i Mazur w Olsztynie), a hotel and a restaurant.

History

The castle was built by the Bishop of Warmia, Jan of Miśnia, however the castle's first occupiers where the Teutonic Knights. In 1780 a part of the castle was adapted for a prison. In 1806 and 1807 a fire devastated the medieval castle. The castle was reconstructed in 1822, and from then on housing a Lutheran church. During the interwar period, the castle housed a museum, which is now a modern hotel.

See also
Castles in Poland

References

Castles in Warmian-Masurian Voivodeship
Kętrzyn County